Thomas Chung An-Zu (born 7 August 1952) is the current serving archbishop of the Roman Catholic Archdiocese of Taipei, Taiwan and Apostolic Administrator of Kinmen or Quemoy Islands and Matzu.

Early life 
Chung was born in Yunlin County in Taiwan on 7 August 1952.

Priesthood 
On 26 December 1981, Chung was ordained a priest for the Roman Catholic diocese of Tainan, Taiwan.

Episcopate 
Chung was appointed Auxiliary Bishop of Taipei, Taiwan and Titular Bishop of Munatiana on 31 October 2006 by Pope Benedict XVI. He was consecrated a bishop on 30 December 2006 by Archbishop Joseph Cheng Tsai-fa. He was appointed bishop of Roman Catholic Diocese of Chiayi on 24 January 2008. He was appointed Archbishop of Roman Catholic Archdiocese of Taipei and Apostolic Administrator of Kinmen or Quemoy Islands and Matzu, Taiwan on 23 May 2020 by Pope Francis.

References 

Roman Catholic archbishops in Asia
1952 births
Living people
People from Yunlin County
Bishops appointed by Pope Benedict XVI
Taiwanese Roman Catholic archbishops
21st-century Roman Catholic archbishops in Taiwan